Akbarpur Lok Sabha constituency is one of the 80 Lok Sabha (parliamentary) constituencies in Uttar Pradesh state in northern India. This constituency came into existence in 2008 as a part of the implementation of delimitation of parliamentary constituencies based on the recommendations of the Delimitation Commission of India constituted in 2002.

Assembly Segments

These assembly segments were earlier in erstwhile Bilhaur and Ghatampur (SC) parliamentary constituencies.

Members of Parliament

Election results

See also
 Kanpur Dehat district
 List of Constituencies of the Lok Sabha
 Kanpur Nagar Lok Sabha constituency
 Bilhaur, Kanpur Lok Sabha constituency
 Ghatampur, Kanpur Lok Sabha constituency
 Kanpur (Mayoral Constituency)
 Kanpur (Division Graduates Constituency)

References

External links
 Akbarpur Lok Sabha Election Results

Lok Sabha constituencies in Uttar Pradesh